Sorbus leptophylla, the thin-leaved whitebeam, is a species of plant in the family Rosaceae. It is endemic to Wales.

References

leptophylla
Endemic flora of Wales
Critically endangered plants
Taxonomy articles created by Polbot